The Bengali Night is a 1988 semi-autobiographical film based upon the Mircea Eliade 1933 Romanian novel, Bengal Nights, directed by Nicolas Klotz and starring Hugh Grant, Soumitra Chatterjee, Supriya Pathak and Shabana Azmi.

Plot summary
Allan (Hugh Grant) is an engineer working in 1930s Calcutta. He is invited to stay with the family of his boss, Narendra Sen (Soumitra Chatterjee)  which includes his wife, Indira (Shabana Azmi) and daughter Gayatri (Supriya Pathak). Gayatri and Allan become romantically involved leading to tragedy.

Cast
 John Hurt as Lucien Metz
 Hugh Grant as Allan
 Soumitra Chatterjee as Narendra Sen
 Shabana Azmi as Indira
 Supriya Pathak as Gayatri

Production history
Production of the film occurred about a decade after Maitreyi Devi (the inspiration for the character Gayatri) published her version of the story Na Hanyate, (originally published in Bengali). She also extracted a promise from Eliade that his version would never be published in English as long as she is alive.  According to Ginu Kamani in "A Terrible Hurt:The Untold Story behind the Publishing of Maitreyi Devi," Maitreyi witnessed the making of the film "The Bengali Night," which was shot in Calcutta from 1987-88 (Eliade had died that year). Her protests culminated "in court cases against the film for insulting Hinduism and for being pornographic." The film was only shown once in India at a film festival in 1989 to mixed reviews and was never released in theaters in the U.S. Kamani also notes:

Devi was bitter about the whole affair. She wrote in 1988: "Christinel [Eliade's widow] has hurt me very badly. She gave permission to a French Co. to film La Nuit Bengali. They came to Calcutta for shooting and gave huge publicity pointing at me as the heroine." It was a close enough breach of Eliade's promise that his book would not come out in English during her lifetime. But it is not known whether Mrs. Eliade was following her husband's wishes or her own.

The film was mostly shot at the huge Zamindar Mansion - "Gaine Bari" of the village of Dhanyakuria and some parts at Indrapuri Studios, Kolkata.

References

External links
A Terrible Hurt:The Untold Story behind the Publishing of Maitreyi Devi

1988 films
1988 drama films
English-language French films
1980s French-language films
French biographical drama films
Films based on Romanian novels
Films based on works by Mircea Eliade
Films about interracial romance
Films set in Kolkata
Films set in the British Raj
Films set in India
Swiss biographical drama films
British biographical drama films
Films with screenplays by Jean-Claude Carrière
1980s British films
1980s French films